CISSP (Certified Information Systems Security Professional) is an independent information security certification granted by the International Information System Security Certification Consortium, also known as (ISC)².

As of July, 2022 there are 156,054 (ISC)² members holding the CISSP certification worldwide.

In June 2004, the CISSP designation was accredited under the ANSI ISO/IEC Standard 17024:2003. It is also formally approved by the U.S. Department of Defense (DoD) in their Information Assurance Technical (IAT), Managerial (IAM), and System Architect and Engineer (IASAE) categories for their DoDD 8570 certification requirement.

In May 2020, The UK National Academic Recognition Information Centre assessed the CISSP qualification as a Level 7 award, the same level as a Masters degree. The change enables cyber security professionals to use the CISSP certification towards further higher education course credits and also opens up opportunities for roles that require or recognize master’s degrees.https://www.isc2.org//-/media/ISC2/Certifications/CISSP/Benchmarking-the-ISC2-UK-NARIC-Exec-SumApril-2020-V2b.ashx

 History 
In the mid-1980s, a need arose for a standardized, vendor-neutral certification program that provided structure and demonstrated competence. In November 1988, the Special Interest Group for Computer Security (SIG-CS), a member of the Data Processing Management Association (DPMA), brought together several organizations interested in this goal. The International Information Systems Security Certification Consortium or "(ISC)²"  formed in mid-1989 as a non-profit organization.

By 1990, the first working committee to establish a Common Body of Knowledge (CBK) had been formed. The first version of the CBK was finalized by 1992, and the CISSP credential was launched by 1994.

In 2003 the CISSP was adopted as a baseline for the U.S. National Security Agency's ISSEP program.
 Certification subject matter 
The CISSP curriculum breaks the subject matter down into a variety of Information Security topics referred to as domains. The CISSP examination is based on what (ISC)² terms the Common Body of Knowledge (or CBK). According to (ISC)², "the CISSP CBK is a taxonomy – a collection of topics relevant to information security professionals around the world. The CISSP CBK establishes a common framework of information security terms and principles that allow information security professionals worldwide to discuss, debate and resolve matters pertaining to the profession with a common understanding."

From 1st May 2021 there will be a domain refresh that will impact the weighting of the domains, the domains themselves will not change.

From 15 April 2018, the eight domains covered are :
Security and Risk Management
Asset Security
Security Architecture and Engineering
Communication and Network Security
Identity and Access Management (IAM)
Security Assessment and Testing
Security Operations
Software Development Security

From 2015 to early 2018, the CISSP curriculum was divided into eight domains similar to the latest curriculum above. The only domain to have changed its name was "Security Engineering," which in the 2018 revision was expanded to "Security Architecture and Engineering."

Before 2015, it covered ten domains:

 Operations security
 Telecommunications and network security
 Information security governance and risk management
 Software development security
 Cryptography
 Security architecture and design
 Access control
 Business continuity and disaster recovery planning
 Legal, regulations, investigations and compliance
 Physical (environmental) security

 Requirements 
 Possess a minimum of five years of direct full-time security work experience in two or more of the (ISC)² information security domains (CBK). One year may be waived for having either a four-year college degree, a master's degree in Information Security, or for possessing one of a number of other certifications. A candidate without the five years of experience may earn the Associate of (ISC)² designation by passing the required CISSP examination,  valid for a maximum of six years. During those six years a candidate will need to obtain the required experience and submit the required endorsement form for certification as a CISSP. Upon completion of the professional experience requirements the certification will be converted to CISSP status.
 Attest to the truth of their assertions regarding professional experience and accept the CISSP Code of Ethics.
 Answer questions regarding criminal history and related background.
 Pass the multiple choice CISSP exam (four hours, up to 175 questions, in an adaptive exam) with a scaled score of 700 points or greater out of 1000 possible points, you must achieve a pass in all eight domains.
 Have their qualifications endorsed by another (ISC)² certification holder in good standing.

 Member counts 
Number of CISSP members as of July, 2022 is 156,054.

 Concentrations 
Holders of CISSP certifications can earn additional certifications in areas of speciality. There are three possibilities:

 Information Systems Security Architecture Professional (CISSP-ISSAP), an advanced information security certification issued by (ISC)² that focuses on the architecture aspects of information security. The certification exam consists of 125 questions covering six domain areas:
 Identity and Access Management Architecture
 Security Operations Architecture
 Infrastructure Security
 Architect for Governance, Compliance, and Risk Management
 Security Architecture Modeling
 Architect for Application Security

As of 1st July 2021, there were 2,158 (ISC)² members holding the CISSP-ISSAP certification worldwide. 

 Information Systems Security Engineering Professional (CISSP-ISSEP), an advanced information security certification issued by (ISC)² that focuses on the engineering aspects of information security across the systems development life cycle. In October 2014 it was announced that some of its curricula would be made available to the public by the United States Department of Homeland Security through its National Initiative for Cybersecurity Careers and Studies program. Both ZDNet and Network World have named ISSEP one of tech’s most valuable certifications.Network World (Dec 2013): 18 Hot IT Certifications for 2014 The certification exam consists of 125 questions covering 5 domain area:
 Security Engineering Principles
 Risk Management
 Security Planning, Design, and Implementation
 Secure Operations, Maintenance, and Disposal
 Secure Engineering Technical Management

As of 1st July 2021, there were 1,272 (ISC)² members holding the CISSP-ISSEP certification worldwide. 

 Information Systems Security Management Professional (CISSP-ISSMP)',  an advanced information security certification issued by (ISC)² that focuses on the management aspects of information security. In September 2014, Computerworld rated ISSMP one of the top ten most valuable certifications in all of tech. The certification exam consists of 125 questions covering 6 domain areas:
 Leadership and Business Management
 Systems Lifecycle Management
 Risk Management
 Threat Intelligence and Incident Management
 Contingency Management
 Law, Ethics, and Security Compliance Management

As of 1st July 2021, there were 1,324 (ISC)² members holding the CISSP-ISSMP certification worldwide. 

 Fees and ongoing certification 
The standard exam costs $749 US as of 2021. On completion of the exam, to gain certification you need to complete an endorsement process to evidence at least five years experience within a mix of the domains.  A dispensation can be claimed for one year with the relevant academic qualification. The final step is payment of the annual maintenance fee of $125 (as of 2020).

The CISSP credential is valid for three years; holders renew either by submitting 40 Continuing Professional Education (CPE) credits per year over three years or re-taking the exam.

CPE credits are gained by completing relevant professional education.

 Value 
In 2005, Certification Magazine surveyed 35,167 IT professionals in 170 countries on compensation and found that CISSPs led their list of certificates ranked by salary. A 2006 Certification Magazine'' salary survey also ranked the CISSP credential highly, and ranked CISSP concentration certifications as the top best-paid credentials in IT.

In 2008, another study came to the conclusion that IT professionals with CISSP (or other major security certifications) and at least 5 years of experience tend to have salaries around US, about US (or 26%) higher than IT professionals with similar experience levels who do not have such certificates. Note that any actual cause-and-effect relationship between the certificate and salaries remains unproven.

As of 2017, a study by CyberSecurityDegrees.com surveyed some 10,000 current and historical cyber security job listings that preferred candidates holding CISSP certifications. CyberSecurityDegrees found that these job openings offered an average salary of  more than the average cyber security salary.

ANSI certifies that CISSP meets the requirements of ANSI/ISO/IEC Standard 17024, a personnel certification accreditation program.

See also 
CISM (Certified Information Security Manager)

References

External links 

Computer security qualifications
Data security
Information technology qualifications
(ISC)²